5751 Zao, provisional designation , is an Amor asteroid discovered by Japanese astronomer M. Koishikawa at the Ayashi Station of the Sendai Astronomical Observatory on 5 January 1992

Physical properties 
Zao has been observed by several groups to determine its rotational period. Its light curve was observed by Pravec, et al. between 1992 and 1995 with the intention of determining its rotational period. From its nearly constant brightness it was determined that the asteroid is roughly spherical and has a rotational period of ≥ 21.7 hr. Another group led by Wisniewski conducted an approximately 5 hour observation and were unable to conclude a rotational period. Zao was again observed in 2001 by Delbó, et al. using the Keck telescope. They were able to determine the asteroid's albedo of 0.36 and re-classify the asteroid from X-type to E-type. Using the asteroid's albedo and the Near Earth Asteroid Thermal Model (NEATM) the asteroid's diameter was estimated to be 2.3 km. Further study of the asteroid by the Ondrejov Asteroid Photometry Project concludes that a rotational period of 76 hours is consistent with earlier measurements.

References

External links 
 IAUC 5426 – Initial discovery
 IAUC 5442 – Refined orbital elements
 IAUC 5474 – Extension to ephemeris
 
 
 

005751
Discoveries by Masahiro Koishikawa
Named minor planets
005751
19920105